Arsennaria was an ancient Roman town of the Roman province of Mauretania Caesariensis in North Africa, and an ancient episcopal see of the Roman Catholic Church.

Town Remains 
The ruins of the city are tentatively located at Bou-Râs in modern Algeria. (36.334326n, 0.873111e)

Arsennaria flourished from 330BC – AD640.

Bishopric
The only known bishop of this town from antiquity is Filone, who took part in the synod assembled in Carthage in 484 by the Vandal King Huneric, after which Filone was exiled.

Although the diocese did not survive past the Muslim conquest of the Maghreb, Arsennaria survives today as a titular bishopric, and the last bishop was José Alberto Rozo Gutiérrez, an apostolic vicar of Puerto Gaitán.

References

Archaeological sites in Algeria
Catholic titular sees in Africa
Roman towns and cities in Mauretania Caesariensis
Ancient Berber cities